Tomáš Kulvajt (born 13 April 1979) is a Czech former football player. He played in the Gambrinus liga for Bohemians and Baník Most, as well as at lower levels for clubs including Mladá Boleslav and Dukla Prague. He was the top scorer for Dukla in the autumn part of the 2007–08 season, netting four league goals for the club.

References

External links
 

1979 births
Living people
Czech footballers
Czech First League players
Bohemians 1905 players
FK Mladá Boleslav players
FK Baník Most players
FK Dukla Prague players

Association football forwards